Rick Galbos (born July 21, 1951) is a former American football running back who played in the Canadian Football League.

Early life and high school
Galbos grew up in Mentor, Ohio and attended Mentor High School, where he was a member of the track, swimming and football teams. As a senior, he quarterbacked Mentor to an undefeated season and the number two ranking in the state while also passing and rushing for 900 yards. Galbos was inducted into the News-Herald High School Sports Hall of Fame in 2016.

College career
Galbos was a member of the Ohio State Buckeyes for four seasons. He was moved to running back and was the team's starting wingback as a junior and as a senior, when he was also a team captain. He finished his collegiate career with 859 rushing yards on 197 carries and 4 touchdowns and caught 21 passes for 293 yards and one touchdown.

Professional career
Galbos was selected in the ninth round of the 1973 NFL Draft by the Washington Redskins, but opted to instead sign with the Saskatchewan Roughriders of the Canadian Football League (CFL). The Roughriders traded him to the Calgary Stampeders before the start of his rookie season. That season he served primarily as a blocking back for Willie Burden. Galbos was traded to the Montreal Alouettes during the 1977 season and was a member of the team as they won the Grey Cup. After the season he was signed by the Redskins and suffered a hamstring injury in training camp.

Post-football
Galbos remained in Canada after his playing career ended and now works in the construction business.

References

1951 births
Living people
American football running backs
Canadian football running backs
Ohio State Buckeyes football players
Players of American football from Ohio
Calgary Stampeders players
Montreal Alouettes players